Antonio Harvey (born July 6, 1970) is an American former professional basketball player. During his pro club career, Harvey played in the National Basketball Association (NBA). He also played professionally in several other leagues overseas.

College career
Born in Pascagoula, Mississippi, Harvey attended  Pascagoula High, in Pascagoula, Mississippi, where he played high school basketball. After high school, Harvey played college basketball at Southern Illinois University. He played with the school's men's team, the Southern Illinois Salukis (1988–1989).

Harvey next played college basketball at Connors State College (1989–90), before moving to the University of Georgia, where he played with the Georgia Bulldogs (1990–1991). He then played college basketball at Pfeiffer University, where he played with the Pfeiffer Falcons, from 1991 to 1993.

Professional career
Harvey was bypassed in the 1993 NBA draft. After playing during the summer 1993, with the Atlanta Eagles of the USBL, he signed as a free agent in 1993, with the NBA's Los Angeles Lakers, for whom he started on opening night of the 1993–94 season. In 1995, Harvey competed in the NBA Slam Dunk Contest. In the contest, he is remembered for when he waited until the final seconds, to do a 360-degree dunk, but missed it, as he ended up in 4th place. He played with five other NBA teams, as well as in Greece, Spain, Poland and Italy.

Coaching career
In April 2004, Harvey was named the general manager and head coach of the American Basketball Association's Portland Reign.

Broadcasting career
Harvey was in radio broadcasting for the Portland Trail Blazers, from 2005 to 2016.

Career statistics

Source

NBA

Regular season

|-
|style="text-align:left;"|
|style="text-align:left;"|L.A. Lakers
|27||6||9.1||.367||–||.462||2.2||.2||.3||.7||2.6
|-
|style="text-align:left;"|
|style="text-align:left;"|L.A. Lakers
|59||8||9.7||.438||1.000||.533||1.7||.4||.3||.7||3.0
|-
|style="text-align:left;"|
|style="text-align:left;"|Vancouver
|18||6||22.8||.411||.000||.465||5.2||.5||.8||1.2||5.4
|-
|style="text-align:left;"|
|style="text-align:left;"|L.A. Clippers
|37||9||11.1||.341||–||.450||2.9||.2||.4||.7||2.9
|-
|style="text-align:left;"|
|style="text-align:left;"|Seattle
|6||0||4.3||.455||–||.833||1.7||.2||.0||.7||2.5
|-
|style="text-align:left;"|
|style="text-align:left;"|Portland
|19||0||7.2||.567||–||.583||1.7||.3||.1||.3||2.2
|-
|style="text-align:left;"|
|style="text-align:left;"|Portland
|12||0||6.0||.464||–||.833||1.2||.3||.1||.5||2.6
|-
|style="text-align:left;"|
|style="text-align:left;"|Seattle
|5||3||9.4||.333||–||.500||1.8||1.0||.2||.6||1.8
|-
|style="text-align:left;"|
|style="text-align:left;"|Atlanta
|4||0||8.0||.400||–||–||1.5||.0||.3||1.0||1.0
|- class=sortbottom
|style="text-align:center;" colspan=2|Career
|187||32||10.4||.407||.333||.511||2.3||.3||.3||.7||3.0

Playoffs

|-
|style="text-align:left;"|1995
|style="text-align:left;"|L.A. Lakers
|3||0||1.3||–||–||–||.3||.0||.0||.0||.0
|-
|style="text-align:left;"|2001
|style="text-align:left;"|Portland
|2||0||7.0||.000||–||–||3.0||.0||.0||.0||.0
|- class="sortbottom"
|style="text-align:center;" colspan=2|Career
|5||0||3.6||.000||–||–||1.4||.0||.0||.0||.0

References

External links
NBA.com player file
NBA stats @ basketball-reference.com

1970 births
Living people
African-American basketball players
American expatriate basketball people in Canada
American expatriate basketball people in Greece
American expatriate basketball people in Italy
American expatriate basketball people in Poland
American expatriate basketball people in Spain
American men's basketball players
Atlanta Hawks players
Basketball players from Mississippi
CB Granada players
Connors State College alumni
Georgia Bulldogs basketball players
Idaho Stampede (CBA) players
Irakleio B.C. players
Liga ACB players
Los Angeles Clippers players
Los Angeles Lakers players
Montecatiniterme Basketball players
Panionios B.C. players
People from Pascagoula, Mississippi
Pfeiffer Falcons men's basketball players
Polonia Warszawa (basketball) players
Portland Trail Blazers players
Portland Trail Blazers announcers
Power forwards (basketball)
Seattle SuperSonics players
Undrafted National Basketball Association players
Vancouver Grizzlies expansion draft picks
Vancouver Grizzlies players
United States Basketball League players
21st-century African-American sportspeople
20th-century African-American sportspeople